Meltem is a Turkish given name for females. It derives from the Turkish word for the strong, dry, north winds of the Aegean Sea (Greek etesiai ετησίαι or meltemi μελτέμι).

People named Meltem include:

 Meltem Akar (born 1982), Turkish boxer
 Meltem Arıkan (born 1968), Turkish novelist and playwright
 Meltem Cumbul (born 1969), Turkish actress 
 Meltem Hocaoğlu (born 1992), Turkish karateka.

See also
 , a Turkish steamship in service 1951-56

Turkish feminine given names